This is a list of all Open Era tennis Grand Slam singles champions and how old they were when they won their first title. Players who won a title before the Open Era are designated with an asterisk (*), but those results do not factor into these lists.

Men

Women

° Note that women's finals occur on the penultimate day of each event.

Career evolution (by age)
 Updated after 2023 Australian Open.
 Only players with three or more singles titles (won during the Open Era) are included.

Grand Slam titles

Men

Women

References

grand slam